The 1975 World Figure Skating Championships were held in Colorado Springs, Colorado, USA from March 4 to 8. At the event, sanctioned by the International Skating Union, medals were awarded in men's singles, ladies' singles, pair skating, and ice dancing.

The ISU Representative was Jacques Favart of France and the ISU Technical Delegate was Hermann Schiechtl of West Germany.

Men's compulsory figures were performed on March 4 at 8 am and ladies' figures took place the next day. The number of figures executed by each skater had been reduced from six to three.

Medal table

Results

Men

Referee:
 Benjamin Wright 

Assistant Referee:
 Donald H. Gilchrist 

Judges:
 Evgenia Bogdanova 
 Éva György 
 Ardelle K. Sanderson 
 Kinuko Ueno 
 Günter Teichmann 
 Ralph S. McCreath 
 Monique Georgelin 
 Mary Groombridge 

Substitute judge:
 Sydney R. Croll

Ladies

Referee:
 Josef Dědič 

Assistant Referee:
 Sonia Bianchetti 

Judges:
 Walburga Grimm 
 János Zsigmondy 
 William Lewis 
 Thérèse Maisel 
 Ludwig Gassner 
 Ramona McIntyre 
 Jacqueline Itschner 
 Elsbeth Bon 
 Kazuo Ohashi 

Substitute judge:
 Pamela Davis

Pairs

Referee:
 Elemér Terták 

Assistant Referee:
 Oskar Madl 

Judges:
 Jane Sullivan 
 Elsbeth Bon 
 János Zsigmondy 
 Irina Absaliamova 
 Walburga Grimm 
 Audrey Williams 
 Maria Zuchowicz 
 Jürg Wilhelm 
 Ludwig Gassner 

Substitute judge:
 Sydney R. Croll

Ice dancing

Referee:
 Lawrence Demmy 

Assistant Referee:
 Edith M. Shoemaker 

Judges:
 Courtney Jones 
 Igor Kabanov 
 Cia Bordogna 
 Vera Spurná 
 Maria Zuchowicz 
 Pierrette Devine 
 Jürg Wilhelm 
 Mabel Graham 
 Klára Kozári

References

Sources
 Result list provided by the ISU

World Figure Skating Championships
World Figure Skating Championships
Sports competitions in Colorado Springs, Colorado
International figure skating competitions hosted by the United States
World Figure Skating Championships
March 1975 sports events in the United States
World Figure Skating Championships
1970s in Colorado Springs, Colorado